In classical studies the term epyllion (Ancient Greek: , plural:) refers to a comparatively short narrative poem (or discrete episode within a longer work) that shows formal affinities with epic, but betrays a preoccupation with themes and poetic techniques that are not generally or, at least, primarily characteristic of epic proper.

Etymology and modern usage

This is in fact the only ancient instance of the word that shows anything approaching the connotations with which it is most often employed by modern scholars, and epyllion did not enter the common language of criticism until the 19th century. The locus classicus for the sense of epyllion as a hexametric mythological poem that is not only comparatively short, but also imbued to some extent with the characteristics of Hellenistic poetry is Moritz Haupt's 1855 study of Catullus 64, but it is likely that Haupt was using a term that had in the preceding decades become common to discussions of the shorter narrative poems of the Alexandrians.

In the early 20th century the first studies specifically devoted to the concept of the epyllion were undertaken, with Leumann's work on Hellenistic epyllia, Jackson's study of the possible Roman examples, and Crump's attempt at a diachronic study of the epyllion as a single genre whose history could be traced from the Greek poems of the Hellenistic period through the Augustan period's Latin texts. The exact meaning and applicability of the term epyllion has remained a matter of dispute, and Richard Hunter's recent appraisal summarizes well the current opinion regarding epyllia:

Characteristics
An epyllion is, in its most basic definition, a narrative poem written in dactylic hexameters that is comparatively short. There is disagreement about whether the term should also be applied to works written in elegiac couplets. The exact meaning of "comparatively short" varies among modern scholars, with some considering Theocritus, Idyll 13 (75 lines) an epyllion, while Eratosthenes' Hermes is commonly classed as an example, even though at some 1,600 lines it would probably have taken up two papyrus rolls. A similar variation in lengths is found in epyllia that form episodes within larger works.  Virgil's Nisus and Euryalus digression in the Aeneid totals 73 verses and is sometimes considered an epyllion, while the so-called Aristaeus-epyllion (Georgics 4.315–558) is considerably more substantial and reminiscent of independent epyllia from the Hellenistic period.

Subject matter and tone

Poetic techniques

Callimachus, Hecale fr. 1 Hollis = 230 Pf.:

Catullus 64.50–54:

List of epyllia

Hellenistic

 Philitas, Hermes
 Alexander Aetolus, Fisherman
 Callimachus, Hecale
 Theocritus 13, 22, 24, [25]
 Eratosthenes, Hermes (debated)
 Moschus, Europa
 Batrachomyomachia, Homer (Roman attribution)

Latin

 Cinna, Zmyrna
 Calvus, Io
 Catullus 64
 Ciris
 Vergil, Georgics 4.315–558: the Aristaeus-epyllion
 Vergil, Aeneid 9.182–234: Nisus and Euryalus
 Ovid, Metamorphoses 8.611–724: Baucis and Philemon

Late antiquity

 Coluthus, Rape of Helen
 Musaeus, Hero and Leander

Notes

Bibliography

 .
 .
 .
 .
 .
 .
 .
 . (Reprinted in 1967 by Georg Olms Verlag (Hildesheim))
 .
 .
 .
 .
 .
 .

Ancient Greek poetry
Latin poetry